Děkov is a municipality and village in Rakovník District in the Central Bohemian Region of the Czech Republic. It has about 200 inhabitants.

Administrative parts
Villages of Nová Ves and Vlkov are administrative parts of Děkov.

Geography
It lies in the Rakovník Uplands.

History
The first written mention of Děkov is from 1325.

Sights
The main landmark of Děkov is the Church of Saint John the Baptist. It was first mentioned in 1361. In 1664, it was replaced by the current early Baroque building. The church was rebuilt in 1729 and extended in 1868.

References

External links

Villages in Rakovník District